The 1905–06 Kentucky State men's basketball team competed on behalf of the University of Kentucky during the 1905–06 season. They started their season and had winning record (3–2 in the first three fives games) for the first time in their history. Afterwards, however, they would lose 7 of 9 of the rest of their games to finish 5–9.

Roster

Schedule

|-
!colspan=12 style="background:#273BE2; color:white;"| Regular Season

References

Kentucky
Kentucky Wildcats men's basketball seasons
Kentucky Wildcats men's b
Kentucky Wildcats men's b